David Charles Harris (born January 21, 1984) is a former American football linebacker of the National Football League (NFL). He played college football for the University of Michigan. Harris was drafted by the New York Jets in the second round of the 2007 NFL Draft.

High school career
Harris attended Ottawa Hills High School in Grand Rapids, Michigan where he played high school football. At linebacker, he set a school record with 158 tackles as a junior, and earned all-state honors from the Detroit Free Press as a senior, and he also contributed as a fullback.

Harris also participated in track and field, and this combination of size and speed led him to become one of the state's top prospects.

College career
Harris received an athletic scholarship to attend the University of Michigan, where he played for the Michigan Wolverines football team. However, he was forced to redshirt as a freshman due to a knee injury which nearly derailed his career. It took nearly two years for Harris to fully recover, and he only played sparingly as a redshirt freshman and sophomore.

Not until his junior year did Harris become a full-time starter. He began to show signs of a future in the NFL when he led the Wolverines in 2005 with 88 tackles, and 103 tackles as a senior. In 2006, he earned All-Big Ten Conference honors, was Wolverines co-MVP with Mike Hart, and was a second-team All-America selection by the Associated Press, Sports Illustrated, and Rivals.com.

National awards
2006 Dick Butkus Award semifinalist

Conference honors
2006 All-Big Ten Conference First-team (coaches) and Second-team (media)

Team awards
 2006 Michigan football team co-MVP with Mike Hart
 2005 & 2006 Roger Zatkoff Award

Professional career
Harris was projected to go anywhere from the late-second round to the fourth round prior to the 2007 NFL Draft.

New York Jets
The New York Jets selected Harris in the second round (47th overall) of the 2007 NFL Draft. The Jets traded their second (63rd overall), third (89th overall), and sixth round picks (191st overall) to the Green Bay Packers and received the Packers' second round pick (47th overall), which they used to select Harris.

2007
On July 26, 2007, the New York Jets signed Harris to a four-year, $3.46 million contract. Throughout training camp, Harris competed against veterans Eric Barton and Victor Hobson for a job as a starting linebacker. Head coach Eric Mangini named Harris a backup inside linebacker to begin the regular season, behind Eric Barton and Victor Hobson.

On October 28, 2007, Harris recorded his first NFL start, making 17 tackles (10 solo) and 1 sack in Week 8 against the Buffalo Bills. Harris started in place of the injured Jonathan Vilma who was placed on injured reserve after a knee injury. Harris made 24 tackles (20 solo) the following week against the Washington Redskins. In 2007, Harris was named NFL's Defensive Rookie of the Month for November 2007.

For the 2007 NFL season, Harris had 127 tackles, 5 sacks, and two forced fumbles despite only starting 9 games, and earned various all-rookie honors.

2008
Harris was named the starter at inside linebacker for the 2008 season. Although an injury shortened season limited Harris to just 11 games, he still posted 87 tackles and 1 sack.

2009
Against the Houston Texans in the first week of the season, Harris finished with 11 tackles (six solo), one sack, and a deflected pass as the defense pitched a shutout. Harris also won AFC Defensive Player of the Week for his play. In week three, as his team was only up seven points, he intercepted a Kerry Collins pass, and then followed that drive by sacking him on first down during the Tennessee Titans next series. Harris himself had 12 tackles, (ten solo). During the Jets' week six game against the Buffalo Bills, Harris recorded 17 tackles. In week 11 against division rivals, Harris recorded 13 tackles (ten solo) as he earned defensive play caller for the Jets that week.

Harris finished his season as the leading tackler on football's number one defense with 127 tackles. He also chipped in with five and a half sacks and two interceptions. In addition, he made second-team all-pro.

The Jets finished the season with a 9-7 record, barely clinching a wild card spot. The team made it to the AFC Championship for the first time since 1998 until losing to the Indianapolis Colts.

2010
On January 16, 2011, Harris recorded his first career postseason interception in which he returned it for 58 yards against the New England Patriots in the AFC Divisional Round. The Jets won 28-21 to advance to their second straight AFC Championship game. It was Tom Brady's first Interception in 11 games (340 pass attempts without an interception). The Jets finished the season 11-5, clinching another wild card spot, and made it to the AFC Championship for the 2nd year in a row, but lost 19-24 against the Pittsburgh Steelers.

2011–2016
Harris recorded 86 tackles, 5 sacks along with 4 interceptions in the 2011 season. On November 9, 2011, he was named AFC's Defensive Player of the Week for his performance against the Buffalo Bills.

In 2012, he recorded 123 combined tackles, 3 sacks, 3 passes defended and one forced fumble.

Harris finished the 2013 season with 124 combined tackles, 2 sacks, one passes defended and one forced fumble.

He finished the 2014 season with 123 combined tackles along with five and half sacks and two forced fumbles.

On March 6, 2015, the Jets re-signed Harris to a three-year, $21.5 million contract with $15 million guaranteed. In 16 starts, he made 108 tackles with 4.5 sacks, 4 passes defended, and 2 forced fumbles. He finished the season with 95 combined tackles, half a sack and two passes defensed.

On June 6, 2017, in a surprising move, Harris was released by the Jets after 10 seasons.

New England Patriots (2017)
On June 21, 2017 Harris signed a two-year contract with the New England Patriots worth $5 million. Harris played in Super Bowl LII, but the Patriots lost 41-33 to the Philadelphia Eagles.

Retirement
On February 23, 2018, Harris announced his retirement from the NFL after 11 seasons.

Career awards and highlights
 Second-team All-Pro selection (2009)
 2× AFC Defensive Player of the Week (Week 1 (2009), Week 9 (2011))
 NFL Defensive Rookie of the Month (November 2007)
 Ed Block Courage Award (2009)
 PFWA NFL All-Rookie Team

NFL career statistics

Personal life
He currently resides in Ann Arbor, Michigan. He was nicknamed The Hitman by New York Jets website host Eric Allen.

References

External links
 New York Jets bio

1984 births
African-American players of American football
Players of American football from Grand Rapids, Michigan
American football linebackers
Living people
Michigan Wolverines football players
New York Jets players
New England Patriots players
21st-century African-American sportspeople
20th-century African-American people
Ed Block Courage Award recipients